Mario Roberto Mihai Contra (born 15 September 1999) is a Romanian professional footballer who plays as a goalkeeper for Liga II side Unirea Slobozia.

References

External links
 
 

1999 births
Living people
Sportspeople from Timișoara
Romanian footballers
Association football goalkeepers
Liga I players
Liga II players
FC Botoșani players
FC Politehnica Timișoara players
ACS Poli Timișoara players
FC Ripensia Timișoara players
SSU Politehnica Timișoara players
AFC Unirea Slobozia players